Çitaku is a surname. Notable people with the surname include:

Gazmend Çitaku (born 1970), Albanian Montenegrin photographer, publisher, and librarian
Ramadan Çitaku (1914–1990), Albanian politician
Vlora Çitaku (born 1980), Kosovar-Albanian politician and diplomat

Albanian-language surnames